Undertale is a 2015 2D role-playing video game created by American indie developer Toby Fox. The player controls a child who has fallen into the Underground: a large, secluded region under the surface of the Earth, separated by a magical barrier. The player meets various monsters during the journey back to the surface, although some monsters might engage the player in a fight. The combat system involves the player navigating through mini-bullet hell attacks by the opponent. They can opt to pacify or subdue monsters in order to spare them instead of killing them. These choices affect the game, with the dialogue, characters, and story changing based on outcomes.

Outside of artwork and character designs by Temmie Chang, Fox developed the entirety of the game by himself, including the script and music. The game took inspiration from several sources, including the Brandish, Mario & Luigi, and Mother role-playing game series, bullet hell shooter series Touhou Project, role-playing game Moon: Remix RPG Adventure, and British comedy show Mr. Bean. Originally, Undertale was meant to be two hours in length and was set to be released in mid-2014. However, development was delayed over the next three years.

The game was released for OS X and Windows in September 2015. It was also ported to Linux in July 2016, PlayStation 4 and PlayStation Vita in August 2017, the Nintendo Switch in September 2018, and Xbox One in March 2021. The game was acclaimed for its thematic material, intuitive combat system, musical score, originality, story, dialogue, and characters. The game sold over one million copies and was nominated for multiple accolades and awards. Several gaming publications and conventions listed Undertale as game of the year, and others have since listed it as one of the greatest video games. Two chapters of a related game, Deltarune, were released in 2018 and 2021.

Gameplay 

Undertale is a role-playing game that uses a top-down perspective. In the game, the player controls a child and completes objectives in order to progress through the story. Players explore an underground world filled with towns and caves, and are required to solve numerous puzzles on their journey. The underground world is the home of monsters, many of whom challenge the player in combat; players decide whether to kill, flee, or befriend them. Choices made by the player radically affect the plot and general progression of the game, with the player's morality acting as the cornerstone for the game's development.

When players encounter enemies in either scripted events or random encounters, they enter a battle mode. During battles, players control a small heart which represents their soul, and must avoid attacks unleashed by the opposing monster similar to a bullet hell shooter. As the game progresses, new elements are introduced, such as colored obstacles, and boss battles which change the way players control the heart. Players may choose to attack the enemy, which involves timed button presses. Killing enemies will cause the player to earn EXP (in turn increasing their LOVE) and gold. They can use the ACT option to check an enemy's attacking and defending attributes as well as perform various other actions, which vary depending on the enemy. If the player uses the right actions to respond to the enemy, or attacks them until they have low HP (but still alive), they can then choose to spare them and end the fight without killing them. For some boss encounters to be completed peacefully, the player is required to survive until the character they are facing has finished their dialogue. The game features multiple story branches and endings depending on whether players choose to kill or spare their enemies; and as such, it is possible to clear the game without killing a single enemy.

Monsters will talk to the player during the battle, and the game will tell the players what the monster's feelings and actions are. Enemy attacks change based on how players interact with them: should players choose non-violent options, enemy attacks are easy, whereas they become less easy if players choose violent options. The game relies on a number of metafictional elements in both its gameplay and story. When players participate in a boss battle on a second playthrough, the dialogue will be altered depending on actions in previous playthroughs.

Plot 
Undertale is set in the Underground, a realm where monsters were banished after war broke out with human. The Underground is sealed from the surface by a magic barrier with a singular gap at Mount Ebott. In the year 201X, a human child falls into the Underground from Mount Ebott and encounters Flowey, a sentient flower who teaches the player the game's mechanics and encourages them to raise their "LV", or "LOVE", by gaining "EXP" through killing monsters. When Flowey attempts to kill the human, the human is rescued by Toriel, a motherly goat-like monster, who teaches the human how to survive conflict in the Underground without killing. She intends to adopt the human, wanting to protect them from Asgore, the king of the Underground.

The human eventually leaves Toriel to search for Asgore's castle, which contains the barrier to the surface world. They encounter several monsters, such as the skeletons Sans and Papyrus, two brothers who act as sentries for the Snowdin forest; Undyne, the head of the royal guard; Alphys, the kingdom's royal scientist; and Mettaton, a robotic television host Alphys created. Most of the monsters are fought, with the human choosing whether to kill them or to spare and possibly befriend the monster. During their travels, the human learns that many years ago, Asriel, the son of Asgore and Toriel, befriended the first human who fell into the Underground. When the child abruptly died, Asriel used the child's soul to pass through the barrier, intending to return the body to the surface. The humans living there attacked and killed Asriel, causing a grieving Asgore to declare war on humans. In the present day, Asgore has collected six souls from fallen humans, of which he needs one more to destroy the barrier.

The game's ending depends on how the player handles encounters with monsters. If the player completes a playthrough without killing any monsters (or killed some but not all of the monsters) they experience the "Neutral" ending. The human arrives at Asgore's castle and is forced to fight him. Sans stops the human before their confrontation, revealing that the human's "LOVE" and "EXP" are acronyms for "level of violence" and "execution points", respectively. Sans judges the human based on their accumulated "LOVE" and "EXP". The human then fights Asgore, but Flowey interrupts, killing Asgore and stealing the human souls. With the help of the souls, the human defeats Flowey and leaves the Underground. They then receive a phone call from Sans, detailing the state of the Underground after the human's departure.

If the player kills no monsters before completing a "Neutral" ending, they can reload their saved game to complete the "Pacifist" ending. Flowey is revealed to be a reincarnation of Asriel accidentally created by Alphys's experiments. During the fight with Asgore, Toriel stops the battle and is joined by the other monsters the human befriended. Flowey ambushes the group, absorbing the souls of all the humans and monsters in order to take an older Asriel's form. During the ensuing fight, the human manages to connect with the souls of their friends, and eventually defeats Asriel: He reverts to his child form, destroys the barrier, and expresses remorse for his actions before leaving. The human falls unconscious and is awoken to see their friends surrounding them. The monsters peacefully reintegrate with the humans, while the human has the option of accepting Toriel as their adoptive mother.

A third ending known as the "No Mercy" or "Genocide" ensues if the player kills all the monsters. When the player reaches Asgore's castle, Sans attempts to stop them, but fails and is slain. Flowey kills Asgore in an attempt to obtain mercy, but is killed by the player. Chara, the first fallen child, then appears and destroys the universe. To enable further replays of the game, the player must give their soul to Chara, restoring the universe and causing a permanent alteration to the Pacifist ending.

Development 
Undertale was developed by Toby Fox across 32 months. Development was financed through a crowdfunding campaign on the website Kickstarter. The campaign was launched on June 25, 2013, with a goal of US$5,000; it ended on July 25, 2013, with US$51,124 raised by 2,398 people. Undertales creation ensued after Fox created a battle system using the game creation system GameMaker: Studio. He wanted to develop a role-playing game that was different from the traditional design, which he often found "boring to play". He set out to develop a game with "interesting characters", and that "utilizes the medium as a storytelling device ... instead of having the story and gameplay abstractions be completely separate".

Fox worked on the entire game independently, besides some of the art; he decided to work independently to avoid relying on others. Fox had little experience with game development; he and his three brothers often used RPG Maker 2000 to make role-playing games, though few were ever completed. Fox also worked on several EarthBound ROM hacks while in high school. Temmie Chang worked as the main artist for the game, providing most of the sprites and concept art. Fox has said that the game's art style would likely remain the same if he had access to a larger team of artists. He found that "there's a psychological thread that says audiences become more attached to characters drawn simply rather than in detail", particularly benefiting from the use of visual gags within the art.

Game design 
The defensive segment within the battle system was inspired by the Mario & Luigi series, as well as bullet hell shooters such as the Touhou Project series. When working on the battle system, Fox set out to create a mechanic that he would personally enjoy. He wanted Undertale to have a battle system equally engaging as Super Mario RPG (1996) and Mario & Luigi: Superstar Saga (2003). Fox did not want grinding to be necessary at any point in the game, instead leaving it optional to players. He also did not wish to introduce fetch quests, as they involve backtracking, which he dislikes. In terms of the game's difficulty, Fox ensured that it was easy and enjoyable. He asked some friends who are inexperienced with bullet hell shooters to test the game, and found that they were able to complete it. He felt that the game's difficulty is optimal, particularly considering the complications involved in adding another difficulty setting.

The game's dialogue system was inspired by Shin Megami Tensei (1992), particularly the gameplay mechanic whereby players can talk to monsters to avoid conflict. Fox intended to expand upon this mechanic, as failing to negotiate resulted in a requirement to fight. "I want to create a system that satisfied my urge for talking to monsters," he said. When he began developing this mechanic, the concept of completing the game without killing any enemies "just evolved naturally". However, he never considered removing the option to fight throughout development. When questioned on the difficulty of playing the game without killing, Fox responded that it is "the crux of one of the major themes of this game", asking players to think about it themselves. Despite not having played it, Fox was inspired by the concepts of Moon: Remix RPG Adventure (1997), which involved the player repairing the damage of the "Hero" and increasing their "Love Level" by helping people instead of hurting them.

Writing 
According to Fox, the "idea of being trapped in an underground world" was inspired by the video game Brandish. Fox was partly influenced by the silliness of internet culture, as well as comedy shows like Mr. Bean. He was also inspired by the unsettling atmosphere of EarthBound. Fox's desire to "subvert concepts that go unquestioned in many games" further influenced Undertales development. Fox found that the writing became easier after establishing a character's voice and mood. He also felt that creating the world was a natural process, as it expressed the stories of those within it. Fox felt the importance to make the game's monsters "feel like an individual". He cited the Final Fantasy series as the opposite; "all monsters in RPGs like Final Fantasy are the same ... there's no meaning to that".

The character of Toriel, who is one of the first to appear in the game, was created as a parody of tutorial characters. Fox strongly disliked the use of the companion character Fi in The Legend of Zelda: Skyward Sword, in which the answers to puzzles were often revealed early. Fox also felt that role-playing video games generally lack mother characters; in the Pokémon series, as well as Mother and EarthBound, Fox felt that the mothers are used as "symbols rather than characters". In response, Fox intended for Toriel's character to be "a mom that hopefully acts like a mom", and "genuinely cares" about players' actions.

Papyrus and Sans are named after the typefaces Papyrus and Comic Sans, and their in-game dialogue is displayed accordingly in their respective eponymous fonts. Both characters are listed in the game's credits as being inspired by J.N. Wiedle, author of Helvetica, a webcomic series about a skeleton named after the font of the same name. Papyrus in particular was conceived as a sketch in Fox's notebook; he was originally a mean spirited character named "Times New Roman" who wears a fedora.

Music 

The game's soundtrack was entirely composed by Fox with FL Studio. A self-taught musician, he composed most of the tracks with little iteration; the game's main theme, "Undertale", was the only song to undergo multiple iterations in development. The soundtrack was inspired by music from Super NES role-playing games, such as EarthBound, bullet hell series Touhou Project, as well as the webcomic Homestuck, for which Fox provided some of the music. Fox also stated that he tries to be inspired by all music he listens to, particularly those in video games. According to Fox, over 90% of the songs were composed specifically for the game. "Megalovania", the song used during the boss battle with Sans, had previously been used within Homestuck and in one of Fox's EarthBound ROM hacks. For each section of the game, Fox composed the music prior to programming, as it helped "decide how the scene should go". He initially tried using a music tracker to compose the soundtrack, but found it difficult to use. He ultimately decided to play segments of the music separately, and connect them on a track. To celebrate the first anniversary of the game, Fox released five unused musical works on his blog in 2016. Four of the game's songs were released as official downloadable content for the Steam version of Taito's Groove Coaster.

Undertales soundtrack has been well received by critics as part of the success of the game, in particular for its use of various leitmotifs for the various characters used throughout various tracks. In particular, "Hopes and Dreams", the boss theme when fighting Asriel in the Pacifist run, brings back most of the main character themes, and is "a perfect way to cap off your journey", according to USgamers Nadia Oxford. Oxford notes this track in particular demonstrates Fox's ability at "turning old songs into completely new experiences", used throughout the game's soundtrack. Tyler Hicks of GameSpot compared the music to "bit-based melodies".

The Undertale soundtrack had frequently been covered by various styles and groups. As part of the fifth anniversary of the game, Fox streamed footage with permission of a 2019 concert of the Undertale songs performed by Music Engine, an orchestra group in Japan, with support of Fangamer and 8-4.

Release 
The game was released on September 15, 2015, for OS X and Windows, and on July 17, 2016, for Linux. Fox expressed interest in releasing Undertale on other platforms, but was initially unable to port it to Nintendo platforms without reprogramming the game due to the engine's lack of support for these platforms. A patch was released in January 2016, fixing bugs and altering the appearance of blue attacks to help colorblind players see them better.

Sony Interactive Entertainment announced during E3 2017 that Undertale would get a release for the PlayStation 4 and PlayStation Vita, a Japanese localization, and a retail version published by Fangamer. These versions were released on August 15, 2017.

A Nintendo Switch version was revealed during a March 2018 Nintendo Direct, though no release date was given at the time; Undertales release on Switch highlighted a deal made between Nintendo and YoYo Games to allow users of GameMaker Studio 2 to directly export their games to the Switch. The Switch version was released on September 15, 2018, in Japan, and on September 18, 2018, worldwide. All the console ports were developed and published by Japanese localizer 8-4 in all regions.

The Xbox One version was released on March 16, 2021. As with the PlayStation 4 and Switch versions, the Xbox One version features unique content specific to that platform.

Other Undertale media and merchandise have been released, including toy figurines and plush toys based on characters from the game. The game's official soundtrack, Undertale Soundtrack, was released by video game music label Materia Collective in 2015, simultaneously with the game's release. Additionally, two official Undertale cover albums have been released: the 2015 metal/electronic album Determination by RichaadEB and Amie Waters, and the 2016 jazz album Live at Grillby's by Carlos Eiene, better known as insaneintherainmusic. Another album of jazz duets based on Undertales songs, Prescription for Sleep, was performed and released in 2016 by saxophonist Norihiko Hibino and pianist Ayaki Sato. A 2xLP vinyl edition of the Undertale soundtrack, produced by iam8bit, was also released in the same year. Two official UNDERTALE Piano Collections sheet music books and digital albums, arranged by David Peacock and performed by Augustine Mayuga Gonzales, were released in 2017 and 2018 by Materia Collective. A Mii Fighter costume based on Sans was made available for download in the crossover title Super Smash Bros. Ultimate in September 2019, marking the character's official debut as a 3D model. This costume also adds a new arrangement of "Megalovania" by Fox as a music track. Super Smash Bros. director Masahiro Sakurai noted that Sans was a popular request to appear in the game. Music from Undertale was also added to Taiko no Tatsujin: Drum 'n' Fun! as downloadable content.

Deltarune 

After previously teasing something Undertale-related a day earlier, Fox released the first chapter of Deltarune on October 31, 2018, for Windows and macOS for free. Deltarune is "not the world of Undertale", according to Fox, though characters and settings may bring some of Undertales world to mind, and is "intended for people who have completed Undertale"; the name Deltarune is an anagram of Undertale. Fox stated that this release is the first part of a new project, considering it a "survey program" to determine the project's future direction. Fox clarified that Deltarune will be a larger project than Undertale, stating it took him a few years to create the game's first chapter, much longer than it took him to complete the Undertale demo.

Chapter 2 of Deltarune was released on September 17, 2021, after Fox acquired a team to help him with further development. Once all chapters are complete, the game will be released as a complete whole; Fox stated that he does not have an anticipated timetable for completion. Deltarune is planned to have only one ending, regardless of what choices the player makes in the game. Although the first two chapters were released at no cost, Fox plans to charge players for the finished release.

Reception 

Undertale received critical acclaim, and was quickly considered a cult classic by numerous publications. Review aggregator Metacritic calculated an average score of 92 out of 100, based on 43 reviews. Metacritic ranks the game the third-highest rated Windows game released in 2015, and among the top 50 of all time. Praise was particularly directed at the game's writing, unique characters, and combat system. GameSpot Tyler Hicks declared it "one of the most progressive and innovative RPGs to come in a long time", and IGNs Kallie Plagge called it "a masterfully crafted experience". By the end of 2015, in a preliminary report by Steam Spy, Undertale was one of the best-selling games on Steam, with 530,343 copies sold. By early February 2016, the game surpassed one million sales, and by July 2018, the game had an estimated total of three and a half million players on Steam. Japanese digital PlayStation 4 and PlayStation Vita sales surpassed 100,000 copies sold by February 2018.

Daniel Tack of Game Informer called the game's combat system "incredibly nuanced", commenting on the uniqueness of each enemy encounter. Giant Bombs Austin Walker praised the complexity of the combat, commenting that it is "unconventional, clever, and occasionally really difficult". Ben "Yahtzee" Croshaw of The Escapist commended the game's ability to blend turn-based and live combat elements. IGNs Plagge praised the ability to avoid combat, opting for friendly conversations instead. Jesse Singal of The Boston Globe found the game's ability to make the player empathize with the monsters during combat if they opted for non-violent actions was "indicative of the broader, fundamental sweetness at the core" of Undertale.

Reviewers praised the game's writing and narrative, with IGNs Plagge calling it "excellent". The Escapist Croshaw considered Undertale the best-written game of 2015, writing that it "is on the one hand hilarious... and is also, by the end, rather heartfelt". Destructoids Ben Davis praised the game's characters and use of comedy, and compared its tone, characters, and storytelling to Cave Story (2004). PC Gamers Richard Cobbett provided similar comments, writing that "even its weaker moments... just about work". Undertales absurd humor attracted praise; Game Rant found the Annoying Dog's frequent interruptions a standout, and Kill Screen considered absurdity a signature quality of Fox's humor.

The game's visuals received mixed reactions. Giant Bombs Walker called it "simple, but communicative". IGNs Plagge wrote that the game "isn't always pretty" and "often ugly", but felt that the music and animations compensate. The Escapist Croshaw remarked that "it wobbles between basic and functional to just plain bad". Other reviewers liked the graphics: Daniel Tack of Game Informer felt that the visuals appropriately match the characters and settings, while Richard Cobbett of PC Gamer commended the ability of the visuals to convey emotion.

Cultural impact

Fandom 

About a year after release, Fox commented that he was surprised by how popular the game had become and though appreciative of the attention, he found it stressful. Fox said: "It wouldn't surprise me if I never made a game as successful again. That's fine with me though". The character Sans has been well received by players, being the subject of many fan works. Professional wrestler Kenny Omega has expressed his love of Undertale, dressing as Sans for the October 30, 2019, episode of All Elite Wrestling: Dynamite. Sans's addition as a Mii fighter costume in Super Smash Bros. Ultimate garnered positive feedback from fans, although The Commonwealth Times considered his addition to be a "potential problem" due to the decreasing nostalgia factor for each new character and ever-increasing size of the roster.

Undertales fanbase has also been subject to controversy, leading to it gaining a negative reputation. After the game's release, some live streamers were harassed by fans of the game for killing in-game enemies and attempting the "genocide" route. YouTuber Markiplier refused to complete his initial play-through of the game, stating that he was "not having fun" due to fan demands.

In July 2016, during a summit about the Internet held at the Vatican, YouTube personality MatPat gifted a copy of Undertale to Pope Francis. MatPat explained his choice of gift by referencing the year 2016's status as the Extraordinary Jubilee of Mercy, and connecting this to Undertales overarching theme of mercy. Later, in January 2022, a circus troupe performed in front of the Pope during his weekly audience at the Vatican to the tune of "Megalovania", drawing parallels with MatPat's symbolic gift of the game to Pope Francis.

Accolades 
The game appeared on several year-end lists of the best games of 2015, receiving Game of the Month and Funniest Game on PC from Rock Paper Shotgun, Best Game Ever from GameFAQs,  and Game of the Year for PC from The Jimquisition, Zero Punctuation, and IGN. It also received Best PC Game from Destructoid, and the Matthew Crump Cultural Innovation Award and Most Fulfilling Crowdfunded Game from the SXSW Gaming Awards.

Undertale garnered awards and nominations in a variety of categories with praise for its story, narrative and for its role-playing. At IGNs Best of 2015, the game received Best Story. Undertale was nominated for the Innovation Award, Best Debut, and Best Narrative at the Game Developers Choice Awards. In 2016, at the Independent Games Festival the game won the Audience Award, and garnered three nominations for Excellence in Audio, Excellence in Narrative, and the Seumas McNally Grand Prize. The SXSW Gaming Awards named it the Most Fulfilling Crowdfunded Game, and awarded it the Matthew Crump Cultural Innovation Award. The same year at the Steam Awards the game received a nomination for the "I'm not crying, there's just something in my eye" award. In 2019, Polygon named the game among the decade's best. In 2021, IGN listed Undertale as the 20th greatest game of all time, while in Japan, a nationwide TV Asahi poll of over 50,000 players listed Undertale as the 13th greatest game of all time.

Notes

References

External links 
 

 
2010s fads and trends
2015 video games
GameMaker Studio games
Genocide in fiction
Independent Games Festival winners
Indie video games
Kickstarter-funded video games
LGBT-related video games
Linux games
MacOS games
Metafictional video games
Nintendo Switch games
PlayStation 4 games
PlayStation Vita games
Puzzle video games
Retro-style video games
Role-playing video games
Science fantasy video games
Single-player video games
Steam Greenlight games
Video games about skeletons
Video games about time loops
Video games developed in the United States
Video games scored by Toby Fox
Video games with alternate endings
Windows games
Xbox Cloud Gaming games
Xbox One games